Jacob Malkoun (born August 26, 1995) is an Australian mixed martial artist who competes in the Middleweight division of the Ultimate Fighting Championship.

Background
At the age of 16, Malkoun started training in martial arts after his father put him in a local boxing gym to shed some his 115 kg Rugby League Prop’s frame where he trains with former UFC Middleweight champion Robert Whittaker. Malkoun is an ADCC Asia 2019 Trials winner and a 2019 Pan Pacific Gold Medalist. He also has a 3-0 record as a Pro Boxer.

Mixed martial arts career

Early career
Debuting in 2017, Malkoun compiled a 4–0 record on the regional Australian scene, winning his debut against Cam Rowston at BRACE 47 via unanimous decision. He would go on to win his next two bouts by the way off TKO; against Ryan Heketa at Hex Fight Series 17 and Christophe Van Dijk at Wollongong Wars 7. In his last bout on the regional scene, he defeated Sebastian Temesi at Eternal MMA 48 via uanimous decision.

Ultimate Fighting Championship
Malkoun made his UFC debut at UFC 254 on October 24, 2020 against Phil Hawes. Malkoun lost the fight via knockout 18 seconds into round one.

Malkoun faced Abdul Razak Alhassan on April 17, 2021, at UFC on ESPN 22. He won the fight via unanimous decision.

Malkoun faced AJ Dobson on February 12, 2022 at UFC 271. He won the fight via unanimous decision.

Malkoun faced Brendan Allen on June 11, 2022 at UFC 275. He lost the bout via unanimous decision.

Malkoun faced Nick Maximov  on October 15, 2022, at UFC Fight Night 212. He won the fight via unanimous decision.

Personal info 
Malkoun's moniker "Mamba" is  after the late NBA Lakers player Kobe Bryant.

Malkoun works as a Jiu Jitsu instructor at Smeaton Grange Gracie Jiu-Jitsu in Sydney.

Championships and accomplishments

Grappling 

 2019: ADCC Asian & Oceanic Championship - 1st place in 99 kg class (Tokyo)

Mixed martial arts record

|-
|Win
|align=center| 7–2
|Nick Maximov
|Decision (unanimous)
|UFC Fight Night: Grasso vs. Araújo
|
|align=center|3
|align=center|5:00
|Las Vegas, Nevada, United States
|
|-
|Loss
|align=center| 6–2
|Brendan Allen
|Decision (unanimous)
|UFC 275
|
|align=center|3
|align=center|5:00
|Kallang, Singapore
|
|-
|Win
|align=center| 6–1
|AJ Dobson
|Decision (unanimous)
|UFC 271
|
|align=center|3
|align=center|5:00
|Houston, Texas, United States
|
|-
|Win
|align=center| 5–1
|Abdul Razak Alhassan
|Decision (unanimous)
|UFC on ESPN: Whittaker vs. Gastelum
|
|align=center|3
|align=center|5:00
|Las Vegas, Nevada, United States
|
|-
|Loss
|align=center| 4–1
|Phil Hawes
|KO (punches)
|UFC 254
|
|align=center| 1
|align=center| 0:18
|Abu Dhabi, United Arab Emirates
| 
|-
|Win
|align=center| 4–0
|Sebastian Temesi
|Decision (unanimous)
|Eternal MMA 48
|
|align=center|3
|align=center|5:00
|Melbourne, Australia
|
|-
|Win
|align=center| 3–0
|Christophe Van Dijk
|TKO (punches)
|Wollongong Wars 7
|
|align=center|3
|align=center|3:31
|Wollongong, Australia
|
|-
|Win
|align=center| 2–0
|Ryan Heketa
|TKO (punches)
|Hex Fight Series 17
|
|align=center|1
|align=center|1:32
|Sydney, Australia
|
|-
|Win
|align=center|1–0
|Cam Rowston
| Decision (unanimous)
|BRACE 47
|
|align=center|3
|align=center|5:00
|Sydney, Australia
|

See also 
 List of current UFC fighters
 List of male mixed martial artists

References

External links 
  
 

1995 births
Living people
Australian male mixed martial artists
Middleweight mixed martial artists
Mixed martial artists utilizing boxing
Mixed martial artists utilizing Brazilian jiu-jitsu
Australian practitioners of Brazilian jiu-jitsu
Australian male boxers
Ultimate Fighting Championship male fighters